Song for the Old World is an album by pianist and composer Anthony Davis recorded in 1978 for the India Navigation label.

Reception

Allmusic awarded the album 4 stars, stating: "In addition to a feature for Hoggard and tributes to the bebop generation and Andrew Hill, the most impressive piece is the title cut which has fragments of melodies from Africa and Asia. This subtle album rewards repeated listenings".

Track listing
All compositions by Anthony Davis except as indicated
 "Behind the Rock" - 4:20
 "Song for the Old World" - 12:30
 "African Ballad" - 5:30
 "59" (Mark Helias) - 7:51
 "An Anthem for the Generation That Died" - 7:27
 "Andrew" - 4:58

Personnel 
 Anthony Davis - piano
 Jay Hoggard - vibraphone
 Mark Helias - bass
 Ed Blackwell - drums, cajón

References 

1978 albums
Anthony Davis (composer) albums
India Navigation albums